Micropilina is a genus of monoplacophoran molluscs. They are very small, mostly deepwater animals which have a superficially limpet-like shell.

In addition to a number of living, deep-sea species, this genus also includes a shallow water fossil from the middle Pleistocene of Italy - and this is the only fossil representative of this lineage subsequent to the Devonian period.

All currently known Micropilina species are less than 1.5 mm in length. Except for Micropilina minuta, they are all found in the Southern Hemisphere.

Species 
Species in the genus Micropilina include:

Recent species:
 Micropilina arntzi Warén & Hain, 1992
 Micropilina minuta Warén, 1989
 Micropilina rakiura Marshall, 1998
 Micropilina reingi Marshall, 2006
 Micropilina tangaroa Marshall, 1992
 Micropilina wareni Marshall, 2006

Fossil species:

External links 
Interactive 3D model contained within PDF of

References

Monoplacophora
Mollusc genera